Stonewall is the codename of two characters from Marvel Comics.

Publication history
The first Stonewall first appeared in Uncanny X-Men #215 and was created by Chris Claremont and Alan Davis.

The second Stonewall first appeared in Mighty Avengers #18 and was created by Brian Michael Bendis and Alex Maleev.

Fictional character biography

Louis Hamilton 

Stonewall and his allies, Crimson Commando and Super Sabre, were all super-powered U.S. veterans of World War II. The trio wished to continue their government service after the war by combatting communism during the Cold War, but they were rebuffed by the U.S. government and forced into retirement. Angered by what they perceived as a decline in morals in the United States, the group became vigilantes. They captured criminals, whom they released and hunted in the wilderness of upstate New York. They killed the criminals, both to reduce the criminal element in society and for the enjoyment of hunting them.

Mistaking Storm (the leader of the X-Men) for a criminal, the team captured and then hunted her. When Storm and Wolverine eventually defeated the three, Stonewall and Crimson Commando agreed to turn themselves in to law enforcement authorities and confess their vigilantism.

Stonewall, Crimson Commando, and Super Sabre (who had been presumed dead) agreed to join Freedom Force, a U.S. government sponsored team of superhumans, in exchange for a commutation of their sentences. Stonewall's first mission with Freedom Force took place during The Fall of the Mutants storyline. Freedom Force tried to prevent the X-Men from entering a building in which Destiny had prophesied that they would die. In the aftermath of the Fall of the Mutants, Stonewall aided Freedom Force in protecting Forge from the New Mutants and attempting to apprehend Cyclops and Marvel Girl.  In an attempt to lure the pro-mutant terrorist group known as The Resistants into a trap, Freedom Force staged a fake trial of an evil mutant. For the fake trial, Stonewall acted as one of the lawyers but he was a disaster since he was inspired by the TV series L.A. Law and issued an objection without any cause.

Stonewall was part of the Freedom Force's expedition to defend Muir Island from the Reavers. During that mission, Stonewall was killed by Donald Pierce while trying to protect Mystique.

Stonewall is resurrected by means of the Transmode Virus to serve as part of Selene's army of deceased mutants.  Under the control of Selene and Eli Bard, he takes part in the assault on the mutant nation of Utopia.

Jerry Sledge

During the Secret Invasion storyline, a man named Jerry Sledge is recruited by Daisy Johnson to be a member of Nick Fury's new Secret Warriors. While in battle, Daisy refers to Jerry as "Stonewall".

It is later revealed that Stonewall is the son of Absorbing Man. He was conceived before his father got his power. One day, he came into contact with his father which caused Stonewall to gain his powers.

During the Chaos War storyline, Stonewall assisted in the fight against Amatsu-Mikaboshi.

Stonewall and the rest of the Secret Warriors are taken to Heaven's Hell, a secret base in orbit. There, Nick Fury explained the plan for the main team to hit HYDRA while the other teams take on the last Leviathan bases. Using Eden's portal they traveled to Gehenna where they attempt to blow it up, but they were expected and the bomb was already armed. Following the fight against HYDRA reunites with the team and joining up with Team Black and the Howling Commandos.

Powers and abilities
Stonewall's mutant physiology granted him tremendous superhuman strength and endurance, including incredible resistance to physical injury. He was especially resistant to blunt physical force, resisting blows from Rogue and the Blob without falling. He was also a skilled physical fighter. He could, however, be grappled and made to lose his footing through indirect attacks. In these cases, his dense body could put him at a disadvantage, as he nearly drowned in a mountain lake after Storm threw him in. Unable to get back to shore on his own, she had to help pull him out. During a fight in the Necrosha event, Stonewall states he is immovable and invulnerable as long as he has solid footing on the ground. He is defeated through the combined forces of Sunspot and Colossus. Stonewall was also vulnerable to energy based attacks that were not kinetic in nature. Donald Pierce killed him with electrocution, flooding his body with electrical energy.

Stonewall II displayed superhuman strength and endurance. But when he lost his temper during a battle with Gorgon, he suddenly changed into a rock-skinned giant. Similar to his father, Stonewall is able to absorb the properties of elements.

References

External links
 Stonewall I at Marvel.com
 Stonewall I at Marvel Wiki
 Stonewall II at Marvel Wiki
 Stonewall I at Comic Vine
 Stonewall II at Comic Vine

Characters created by Brian Michael Bendis
Characters created by Chris Claremont
Characters created by Alan Davis
Characters created by Alex Maleev
Comics characters introduced in 1987
Comics characters introduced in 2008
Fictional World War II veterans
Marvel Comics characters with superhuman strength
Marvel Comics mutants
Marvel Comics supervillains
Vigilante characters in comics